Přívětice is a municipality and village in Rokycany District in the Plzeň Region of the Czech Republic. It has about 200 inhabitants.

Administrative parts
The village of Sklená Huť is an administrative part of Přívětice.

References

Villages in Rokycany District